John Latham (27 June 1740 – 4 February 1837) was an English physician, naturalist and author. His main works were A General Synopsis of Birds (1781–1801) and General History of Birds (1821–1828). He was able to examine specimens of Australian birds which reached England in the last twenty years of the 18th century, and was responsible for providing English names for many of them. He named some of Australia's most famous birds, including the emu, sulphur-crested cockatoo, wedge-tailed eagle, superb lyrebird, Australian magpie, magpie-lark and pheasant coucal. He was also the first to describe the hyacinth macaw. Latham has been called the "grandfather" of Australian ornithology.

Biography
John Latham was born on 27 June 1740 at Eltham in northwest Kent. He was the eldest son of John Latham (died 1788), a surgeon, and his mother, who was a descendant of the Sothebys, in Yorkshire.

He was educated at Merchant Taylors' School and then studied anatomy under William Hunter and completed his medical education in London hospitals. In 1763 at the age of 23 he began working as a physician in the village of Darenth, near Dartford in Kent. In the same year he married Ann Porter. They had four children of whom a son John (1769-1822) and a daughter Ann (1772-1835) survived childhood.

Latham retired from his medical practice aged 56 in 1796 and moved to live near his son at Romsey  in Hampshire. His wife died in 1798 and Latham remarried the same year to Ann Delamott. His son who had invested in a series of inns became heavily indebted and was declared bankrupt in 1817. Latham lost much of his wealth in supporting his son. In 1819 Latham sold his house in Romsey and moved with his wife to live with his daughter's family in Winchester. His second wife died in 1821 and then in the following year his son committed suicide.

Latham died aged 96 in Winchester on 4 February 1837 and was buried in Romsey Abbey.

Contribution to ornithology

A General Synopsis of Birds was Latham's first ornithological work and contained 106 illustrations by the author. It described many new species which Latham had discovered in various museums and collections. In this work, like Georges-Louis Leclerc, Comte de Buffon, he did not attach importance to the names of the species which he described. Later, Latham realised that only the use of the Linnean binomial system would give him the honour of originating the species' scientific names. Thus he published in 1790, a Index Ornithologicus where he specified a binomial name for all the species which he had previously described. However, it was too late, as Johann Friedrich Gmelin had already published his own version of Linnaeus' Systema Naturæ in which he gave a scientific name to Latham's species; taking into account the rules of nomenclature, Gmelin has priority. Nevertheless, there are around eighty bird species for which Latham's 1790 publication is cited as the authority. These include the emu, the black swan, the hyacinth macaw, the sulphur-crested cockatoo, and the noisy friarbird.

A supplement to the Index Ornithologicus containing additional scientific names was published as Supplementum indicis ornithologici sive systematis ornithologiae with the year of 1801 on the title page. Although there is circumstantial evidence that the supplement was not available until 1802, for the purposes of zoological nomenclature the evidence for a later publication date has not been deemed sufficient to justify changing the year.

Working from drawings, Latham appears to have had difficulty in distinguishing the different species and some he described more than once under different names. In his Supplementum Indicis Ornithologici he described the Australian noisy miner four times: as the chattering bee-eater (Merops garrulus), the black-headed grakle (Gracula melanocephala), the hooded bee-eater (Merops cucullatus), and the white-fronted bee-eater (Merops albifrons). This has caused some confusion in the ornithological literature as to the correct scientific name. Latham's 1801 Latin supplement is the authority for around seventy species of birds, almost all of which occur only in Australasia. They include the Pacific gull, the barking owl, the noisy miner, the Australian magpie and the magpie-lark.

Beginning in 1821, when Latham was in his eighties, he published an expanded version in eleven volumes of his earlier work with the title A General History of Birds. The ornithologist Alfred Newton later wrote in Encyclopædia Britannica that: "his defect as a compiler, which had manifest itself before, rather increased with age, and the consequences were not happy."

Latham maintained a regular correspondence with Thomas Pennant, Joseph Banks, Ashton Lever and others. He was elected to the Royal Society in 1775, and also took part in the creation of the Linnean Society. In 1812, he was elected a foreign member of the Royal Swedish Academy of Sciences.

Works

References

Further reading

External links

 

English ornithologists
English taxonomists
1740 births
1837 deaths
British bird artists
English illustrators
Scientific illustrators
Fellows of the Linnean Society of London
Fellows of the Royal Society
Members of the Royal Swedish Academy of Sciences
People from Dartford
18th-century British scientists
18th-century British zoologists
19th-century British zoologists
English naturalists
People educated at Merchant Taylors' School, Northwood
19th-century British scientists
Burials at Romsey Abbey
People from Eltham